Satyawati is a Rural municipality located within the Gulmi District of the Lumbini Province of Nepal.
The rural municipality spans  of area, with a total population of 23,807 according to a 2011 Nepal census.

On March 10, 2017, the Government of Nepal restructured the local level bodies into 753 new local level structures.
The previous Aslewa, Thulo lumpek, Limgha, Hansara, Johang, Juniya and Bharse VDCs were merged to form Satyawati Rural Municipality.
Satyawati is divided into 8 wards, with Johang declared the administrative center of the rural municipality.

References

External links
official website of the rural municipality

Rural municipalities in Gulmi District
Rural municipalities of Nepal established in 2017